Chris McBreen (born 9 August 1972) is a New Zealand former professional snooker player, living in Germany. He was runner-up in the Oceania Play-offs, however Glen Wilkinson who beat him decided not take his place on the Main Tour.

References

External links 
 
 Profile on Pro Snooker Blog

New Zealand snooker players
New Zealand expatriate sportspeople in Germany
1972 births
Living people